Ochiai is a Japanese surname. Notable people with the surname include:

, Japanese voice actor
, Japanese judoka, karateka and writer
, Japanese baseball player and manager
, Japanese footballer
, Japanese film director
, Japanese samurai
, Japanese actor
, pseudonym of Ayukai Morimitsu, Japanese poet
, Japanese sport shooter
, Japanese voice actress
, Japanese basketball player
, Japanese sumo wrestler

See also
Ochiai, Okayama, a former town in Maniwa District, Okayama Prefecture, Japan
Ochiai Station (disambiguation), multiple railway stations in Japan

Japanese-language surnames